This is the discography of Angelo Badalamenti, an American film score composer. Badalamenti composed scores for dozens of films, television shows, and video games. He won one Grammy Award, a Lifetime Achievement Award at the World Soundtrack Awards, and the American Society of Composers, Authors and Publishers Henry Mancini Award.

Soundtracks

Other works 
All individual songs listed are first recordings. When first version is unknown, both are. Notable cover versions are listed under notes.
For much of his early work, Badalamenti was credited as "Andy Badale" or "Andy Badalele"

{| class="wikitable sortable" width=100%
|-
!width="30"|Year
!Title
!width="200"|Artist
!Notes
|-
|1962
|Old Spice
|Clyde and The Bird Watchers
|first known recorded work
|-
|rowspan = "2" | 1964
|I Went By Our House Today
|Polly Perkins
|
|-
|Escapade
|Wynton Kelley Trio
|from It's All Right!
|-
|1965
|Today Will Be Yesterday Tomorrow
|Karl Denver
|B-Side to Cry A Little Sometimes
|-
|rowspan="6" | 1966
|I Hold No Grudge
|rowspan="2"|Nina Simone
|rowspan="2"|from High Priestess of Soul
|-
|He Ain't Comin' Home No More
|-
|Sugar Me Sweet
|Al Caiola
|B-side to Duel At Diablo
|-
|Something On My Mind
|Bobbi Martin
|B-side to Don't Take It Out On Me
|-
|She's Got A Heart
|Roy Hamilton
|B-side to The Impossible Dream
|-
|Visa To The Stars
|Perrey-Kingsley
| from The In Sound From Way Out! 
|-
|rowspan="6" | 1967
|My Love Is Gone From Me
|Ed Ames
|b-side to Who Will Answer?
|-
|I Want To Love You For What You Are
|rowspan="2"|Ronnie Dove
|
|-
|Dancin' Out of My Heart
|
|-
|I Had To Know My Way Around
|Della Reese
|From the album Della On Strings Of Blue
|-
|Pioneers of The Stars
|Perrey-Kingsley
|from Kaleidoscopic Vibrations
|-
|But Only Sometimes
|Nancy Wilson
|
|-
| rowspan="5"|1968
|Face It Girl, It's Over
|Nancy Wilson
|from Easy.Covered by George Benson the same year (as Face it Boy, It's Over) on Shape of Things to Come,and in 1969 by The Delfonics on Sound of Sexy Soul.
|-
|Pendant Que Nous Chantons
|Enrico Macias
|
|-
|I Had To Know My Way Around
|Della Reese
|
|-
|Livin' For Your Lovin|Ronnie Dove
|
|-
|I've Been Here All The Time
|Irene Reid
|From the album I've Been Here All The Time...
|-
| rowspan="8"|1969|Fa-Fa-Fa (Live For Today)
|Shirley Bassey
|
|-
|Passport To The Future
|rowspan="2"|Jean-Jacques Perrey
|
|-
|Mary France
|
|-
|We're Living To Give (To Give To Each Other)
|Ruby Winters
| Covered by Melba Moore in 1970 on I Got Love
|-
|That Love That A Woman Should Give To A Man
|Spanky Wilson
| from the album Doin' It
|-
|World of No Return
| Patti Drew
|-
|Thank You Love
|Dee Dee Warwick
|
|-
|Artificial Light (Of All The Living Lies)
|Bread, Love and Dreams
|from the album Bread, Love and DreamsOriginally recorded by Sagittarius in 1968, but unreleased until the 1997 re-issue of Present Tense
|-
| rowspan="4"|1970|Look What You're Doing To The Man
|rowspan="2"|Melba Moore
|
|-
|I Love Making Love To You
| from I Got Love
|-
|Moog Indigo
|Jean-Jacques Perrey
|five tracks written or co-written by Badalamenti as "Andy Badale"
|-
|Sing Away The World
|Ed Ames
|
|-
| rowspan="4"|1973|Child of Tomorrow
|rowspan="2"|Barbara Mason
| also appears on the Gordon's War soundtrack
|-
|I Miss You Gordon
| from the album Lady Love
|-
|Come On And Dream Some Paradise
|The New Birth
|from the album It's Been a Long Time, also appears on the Gordon's War soundtrack
|-
|Hot Wheels  b/w Harlem Dreams
|Badder Than Evil
|Badalamenti and frequent collaborator Al Elias working under a pseudonym. Both songs also appear on the Gordon's War soundtrack
|-
|1974|Les Trois Pierres Blanches
|Jean-Jacques Perrey
|from the album Moog Mig Mag Moog
|-
|1975|Man Was Made To Love Woman
|Bobbi Martin
|
|-
|1976|How Do You Like Them Apples  b/w Ain't No Room In My Bed
|The Bagdads
| single released by Badalamenti and "Badder Than Evil" collaborator Al Elias under a new band name
|-
|1977|Let Me Down Easy
|Peggy Sue
|from the album I Just Came In Here (To Let A Little Hurt Out)
|-
|1978|Another Spring
|Margret RoadKnight
|from the album Ice.
|-
| 1979|Nashville Beer Garden
|The Andy Badale Orchestra
| Polka album, also released under the name Andy Badale and The Beer Garden Band
|-
|1981|The Story About Ping
|Scholastic Records
|musical setting of the children's book by Marjorie Flack, read by Alice Playten.
|-
|1984|Bony-Legs
|Scholastic Records
|musical setting of the story by Joanna Cole, read by Jean Richard
|-
|1995|A Secret Life
|Marianne Faithfull
|Collaboration with Marianne Faithfull
|-
| 1996|Booth and the Bad Angel
|Booth and the Bad Angel
|Collaboration with Tim Booth of James
|-
|2018'''
|Thought Gang| Thought Gang
| Collaboration with David Lynch on Sacred Bones Records
|}

 Awards 
 1990 – Grammy Award for Best Pop Instrumental Performance: "Twin Peaks Theme"
 2008 – World Soundtrack Awards: Lifetime Achievement Award
 2011 – American Society of Composers, Authors and Publishers: Henry Mancini Award

 Notes 

 References 
 
 
  Note: User search required.''
 
 

Discographies of American artists
Film and television discographies
Discography